Mohamed Kaboré (born December 31, 1980 in Ouagadougou, Burkina Faso) is a Burkinabé football goalkeeper. He currently plays for ASFA Yennenga.

International 
Kaboré was part of the Burkinabé 2004 African Nations Cup team, which finished bottom of its group in the first round of competition, thus failing to secure qualification for the quarter-finals.

Clubs
1997–1999 : Racing Club de Bobo
1999–2002 : ASFA Yennega
2002–2004 : Stade Malien
2004–2006 : Etoile Filante Ouagadougou
2006–2007 : ASEC Mimosas
2008–2013 : Etoile Filante Ouagadougou
2013– : ASFA Yennega

References

External links

1980 births
Living people
Burkinabé footballers
Burkinabé expatriate footballers
Expatriate footballers in Mali
Burkina Faso international footballers
RC Bobo Dioulasso players
Burkinabé Muslims
ASEC Mimosas players
Expatriate footballers in Ivory Coast
ASFA Yennenga players
Burkinabé expatriate sportspeople in Mali
Étoile Filante de Ouagadougou players
Burkinabé expatriate sportspeople in Ivory Coast
Stade Malien players
2002 African Cup of Nations players
2004 African Cup of Nations players
2014 African Nations Championship players
Burkina Faso A' international footballers
Sportspeople from Ouagadougou
Association football goalkeepers
21st-century Burkinabé people